The Falin-Kvitsinsky doctrine is a political doctrine formulated in the USSR. It assumes that in relation to the former Warsaw Pact countries, the military influence of the Soviet Union was to be replaced by the dependence of these countries on Russian gas and oil supplies.

History
During the process of the collapse of the Soviet Union, the Soviet deputy foreign minister  together with the last Soviet ambassador to Germany, Valentin Falin, formulated the Falin-Kvitsinsky doctrine which assumes that the then military influence of the Soviet Union in the territory of the Warsaw Pact countries will not be sustained against the declining economy of the USSR and should be replaced with the dependence of the countries in this area on oil and gas, since the raw materials and energy industry appeared to be the foundation in the process of rebuilding Russia's position as a superpower on the international scene. By the end of 1990 the Soviet leadership developed a strategy in the form of the Falin-Kvitsinsky doctrine which was aimed at the Finlandization of Central and Eastern Europe, since the doctrine accused the West of ‘ousting’ Russia from the region, in which Russia had essential strategic interests.

Despite the collapse of the Soviet Union at the end of 1991, many countries of the former Warsaw Pact remained dependant on Russian supplies of energy resources. Fears of Russian revisionism and the Russian Federation's treatment of energy resources in terms of political weapons, for example through the natural gas pipeline  Nord Stream 2, have led the countries of the region to take certain measures. Russia has the largest production of natural gas in the world and oil production by Russia has increased drastically, especially over the early-2000s, which has led to a continued dependency on Russia for energy resources, by previous satellite countries. About 80% of the natural gas that Russia exports to Western Europe goes through the territory of Ukraine. This has incentivized Russia to continue Influencing the political agenda of the country and other former Warsaw Pact and USSR countries.

Following the 2022 Russian invasion of Ukraine, Russia has halted gas supplies to Bulgaria, Poland and Netherlands for not paying in roubles to shield the country from sanctions. Similarly, following Finland's application to join NATO, Russia stopped providing natural gas to the country. Russia has also reduced gas exports to Germany and Italy without offering an explanation.

See also
Energy policy of the Soviet Union
Petroleum industry in Russia
Natural gas in Russia
Russia in the European energy sector
2022 Russia–European Union gas dispute

References

Foreign policy doctrines
Foreign relations of the Soviet Union
Foreign relations of Russia